The Birds and the Bees is a 1956 screwball comedy film with songs, starring George Gobel, Mitzi Gaynor and David Niven. A remake of Preston Sturges' 1941 film The Lady Eve, which was based on a story by Monckton Hoffe, the film was directed by Norman Taurog and written by Sidney Sheldon.  The costumes for the film were designed by Edith Head.

Plot
George "Hotsy" Hamilton (George Gobel), a very eligible but naive vegetarian heir to a meat-packing fortune, returns home to Connecticut by luxury cruise ship, accompanied by Marty Kennedy (Harry Bellaver), his valet, guardian and best friend, after spending three years together on a scientific expedition in the Belgian Congo looking for a rare snake.  On board, the woman-shy George attracts a lot of attention from the opposite sex, despite being the consummate milquetoast, but the one he cannot avoid is Jean Harris (Mitzi Gaynor), a beautiful con artist travelling with her equally larcenous father, Colonel Patrick Henry "Handsome Harry" Harris (David Niven), and his partner-in-crime Gerald (Reginald Gardiner).

The three con artists are out to fleece George of a small fortune, but even the best-laid plans can go astray. First, Jean falls hard for George and shields him from her card sharp father. Then, when Marty discovers the truth about her and her father and tells George about them, he dumps her.  Furious at being scorned, she re-enters his life masquerading as the posh "Countess Louise", the cousin of "Jacques Duc de Montaigne" (Hans Conreid), who is actually Frenchie, another con man who is swindling the rich folks of Connecticut. Jean is determined to get back at George, so she sets out to seduce him, again.

George's domineering father (Fred Clark) throws a party in honor of the visiting French royalty, and George is completely taken in by Jean's masquerade. Soon her hapless victim is so confused and bothered he does not know which way is up, but, in the end, after all the twists and turns, deceptions and lies, true love wins out.

Cast

George Gobel as George "Hotsy" Hamilton II
Mitzi Gaynor as Jean Harris aka Countess Louise
David Niven as Colonel Patrick Henry Harris
Reginald Gardiner as Gerald
Fred Clark as Horace Hamilton
Harry Bellaver as Marty Kennedy
Hans Conried as Duc Jacques de Montaigne
Margery Maude as Mrs. Hamilton
Clinton Sundberg as Purser
Milton Frome as Assistant Butler
Rex Evans as Burrows - Butler
King Donovan as Waiter
Mary Treen as Mrs. Burnside
Charles Lane as Charlie Jenkins - Bartender

Songs
The songs in The Birds and the Bees were written by Harry Warren (music) and Mack David (lyrics):

"(The Same Thing Happens with) The Birds And The Bees" – performed by George Goebel and Mitzi Gaynor
"La Parisienne" – sung by Mitzi Gaynor

Two other songs were written for the film but not used:

"Each Time I Dream" – by Harry Warren (music) and Mack David (lyrics)
"The Songs I Sing"  – by Walter Scharf (music) and Don Hartman (lyrics)

"(The Same Thing Happens with) The Birds And The Bees" has been recorded by a number of singers, including Barbara Lyon, Alan Dale and Alma Cogan. 
Cogan had a #25 hit with this song in the UK in 1956, credited as "The Birds and the Bees". The full title distinguishes the song from Jewel Akens' later song "The Birds and the Bees", which in 1965 was a #3 hit in the United States.

Production
At the time The Birds and the Bees went into production, "Lonesome" George Gobel had the highest rated television show on NBC, which had been running since 1954, but he had not yet appeared in a film.  This remake of The Lady Eve, the plot of which it follows closely, was designed as a vehicle for Gobel, and had the working titles "The George Gobel Comedy", "The Gobel Story" and "The Lady Eve".  Paul Jones was the producer for both this version of the story and the original.

David Niven, third-billed under Gobel and Gaynor for this film, starred in the epic smash hit Around the World in Eighty Days later that same year.

The film was in production from mid July to 22 April 1955, and opened with a series of invitational premieres in thirty-two key cities across the United States on 20 March 1956, followed by a New York City premiere on 22 April and a general release in May.

See also
List of American films of 1956

References

External links

1956 films
1956 musical comedy films
1950s screwball comedy films
American musical comedy films
American romantic comedy films
American screwball comedy films
Comedy of remarriage films
1950s English-language films
Remakes of American films
Films about con artists
Films based on works by Monckton Hoffe
Films based on works by Preston Sturges
Films directed by Norman Taurog
Films scored by Walter Scharf
Paramount Pictures films
1950s American films